Marina Anatolyevna Pankova née Nikulina (3 March 1963 – 4 November 2015) was a Russian volleyball player, who was a member of the Soviet team that won the gold medal at the 1988 Summer Olympics.

External links
 
 

1963 births
2015 deaths
People from Bratsk
Soviet women's volleyball players
Russian women's volleyball players
Volleyball players at the 1988 Summer Olympics
Volleyball players at the 1992 Summer Olympics
Volleyball players at the 1996 Summer Olympics
Olympic volleyball players of the Soviet Union
Olympic volleyball players of the Unified Team
Olympic volleyball players of Russia
Olympic silver medalists for the Unified Team
Olympic gold medalists for the Soviet Union
Olympic medalists in volleyball
Medalists at the 1992 Summer Olympics
Medalists at the 1988 Summer Olympics
Competitors at the 1994 Goodwill Games
Goodwill Games medalists in volleyball
Galatasaray S.K. (women's volleyball) players
Russian expatriate sportspeople in Spain
Russian expatriate sportspeople in Turkey
Expatriate volleyball players in Spain
Expatriate volleyball players in Turkey
Sportspeople from Irkutsk Oblast